The Song of Sister Maria (Spanish:Sor intrépida) is a 1952 Spanish drama film directed by Rafael Gil and starring Dominique Blanchar, Francisco Rabal and María Dulce.

Synopsis 
Soledad is a famous singer who one day decides to enter a convent, renaming herself Sor María de la Asunción. This decision provokes the confusion of her family, the press and public opinion in general. Now her job is to care for the sick and collect funds to solve the serious economic problems of the order. Finally, she decides to go as a missionary to India to offer her help.

Cast

References

Bibliography 
 Bentley, Bernard. A Companion to Spanish Cinema. Boydell & Brewer 2008.

External links 
 

1952 drama films
Spanish drama films
1952 films
1950s Spanish-language films
Films directed by Rafael Gil
Films scored by Juan Quintero Muñoz
Spanish black-and-white films
1950s Spanish films